Karl Katz (October 22, 1929 - November 8, 2017) was an art historian, curator and museum director. Among the many positions he held over his lifetime, Katz was director of the Bezalel National Museum - which later became The Israel Museum in Jerusalem. He also held positions at the Jewish Museum and the Metropolitan Museum of Art.

Career
Karl Katz, sometimes spelled Carl, was born in 1929. His parents were Maurice Katz and Rose (née Lefkowitz). He graduated from Midwood High School in Brooklyn and then began studying at Long Island University, but soon moved to Columbia University. There he completed a bachelor's degree in art history and Semitic studies and a master's degree in art history and archaeology. He finished his Doctoral dissertation on early Hebrew texts from Yemen, but he failed to do the doctorate because he did not fulfill the prerequisites for the required language skills. He refused to learn German so soon after the Holocaust. One of his mentors who greatly influenced the path he took was Meyer Schapiro.

Katz worked in 1953 as an art educator during the exhibition "From the Land of the Bible" at the Metropolitan Museum. He then joined the Bezalel National Museum as a curator, a forerunner of the Israel Museum. In 1969 he returned to New York and became director of the Jewish Museum. In 1971 he went to the Metropolitan Museum as head of the Department of Special Projects. In 1980 he became head of the department he created for film and television. He was also one of the planners of The Museum of the Jewish People at Beit Hatfutsot.

In 1992 he founded "Muse", a non-profit company for documentaries in the field of art.

In the early 1970s, Katz met the photographer Cornell Capa in an exhibition and persuaded him to put his International Center of Photography into a museum. It opened in 1974. For many years Katz was the deputy chairman of the museum curatorium.

Katz was married to Elizabeth Segal, whom he married in 1978. The couple had a son, Jonathan.

Publications (selection)
 Yehiel Shemi. Bezalel National Museum, Jerusalem 1957
 Modern Israel Painting. London 1958
 with Penuel Kahane, Magen Broshi: From the beginning: four millennia Holy Land in the most modern museum in the world. Hoffmann and Campe, Hamburg 1968
 The exhibitionist: living museum, loving museum. Overlook Press, New York 2016

Filmography (selection)
 1983: La Belle Epoque (1890-1914)
 1984: In a Brilliant Light: Van Gogh in Arles
 1989: Merchants and Masterpieces
 1990: Frederick Law Olmsted and the Public Park of America
 1992: Art on Film, Program 1: Balance
 1992: Art on Film, Program 2: Sense
 1992: Art on Film, Program 3: Form
 1992: Art on Film, Program 4: Voice
 1992: Art on Film, Program 5: Subject & Expert
 1993: Degenerate Art
 1997: Tashilham
 1998: Chuck Close: A Portrait in Progress
 2003: Hans Hofmann: Artist / Teacher, Teacher / Artist
 2006: Who Gets to Call It Art?
 2007: The Rich Their Own Photographers
 2007: Robert Indiana: American Dreamer
 2008: Herb & Dorothy
 2012: Ai Weiwei: Never Sorry

References

External links
 
 Sam Roberts: Karl Katz, Museum Director in New York and Israel, Dies at 88, New York Times, November 10, 2017 link

1929 births
Israeli art historians
American art historians
American emigrants to Israel
American film producers
Directors of museums in the United States
2017 deaths